A list of songs recorded by American rock band Soundgarden.

List

Notes

References

Soundgarden